The University of Arkansas Schola Cantorum represents the pinnacle of choral singing in the state of Arkansas. Since 1957, Schola Cantorum has attracted the most talented singers from across the country, and has performed widely, both domestically and internationally.
Schola Cantorum is under the direction of Dr. Stephen Caldwell in his eighth year at the University of Arkansas. The 2019-2020 ensemble consists of 49 auditioned undergraduate and graduate students from a broad variety of disciplines at the University of Arkansas. Schola Cantorum performs a variety of musical styles from German Baroque cantatas to opera choruses and modern a cappella works. Schola Cantorum has a rich history of exploring a global repertoire from all eras of music history. Schola Cantorum also frequently collaborates with other university ensembles, including the University Symphony Orchestra, Wind Ensemble, and Wind Symphony. Schola Cantorum regularly appears at both the Faulkner Performing Arts Center, and Walton Arts Center in Fayetteville, AR, and tours often throughout the state and abroad.

History 

Schola Cantorum [Latin for 'School of Singers'] was founded in 1957 by Professor of Music Richard Brothers. Originally only 32 voices, Schola Cantorum quickly flourished under his baton. In 1962, Schola Cantorum became the first American choir to win the coveted first prize—The Guido d'Arezzo Award—at the prestigious International Polyphonic Competition in Arezzo, Italy. In honor of its achievement, Schola Cantorum soon after appeared on NBC TV's "Today Show" and performed for U.S. President John F. Kennedy in the White House Rose Garden. In 1964, the choir was invited to the Vatican in Rome to sing for Pope Paul VI. More recently, Schola Cantorum has performed at conferences of the American Choral Directors Association and the National Collegiate Choral Organization, as has toured to Puerto Rico, Belgium, Germany, and the Netherlands.

World premiers 

1982 – Isabella Leonarda's Messa Prima

2011 – Augusta Read Thomas' Floating Temples

2012 – Donald Patriquin's Titanic Requiem

2013 – Stephen Caldwell's Three Meadows

Regional premieres 

2012 – Ola Gjeilo's Evening Prayer

2013 – Stephen Caldwell's Euge Serve

Conductors 

1957 – 1976 – Professor Richard Brothers

1977 – 1997 – Dr. Jack Groh

1998 – 2002 – Dr. David Saladino

2003 – 2009 – Dr. Graeme Langager

2009 – 2012 – Dr. Todd Prickett

2012 – present – Dr. Stephen Caldwell

References

External links
University of Arkansas Music College
University of Arkansas Schola Cantorum – Facebook
University of Arkansas Schola Cantorum – YouTube

American choirs
University choirs
University of Arkansas
Musical groups established in 1957